Robert Pugh (born 11 October 1950) is a Welsh actor, known for his many television appearances, including the role of Craster in the HBO series Game of Thrones.

Life and career
Pugh was born in the Tynte, Mountain Ash and grew up in Cilfynydd, near Pontypridd. He decided to become an actor after watching From Russia with Love at a cinema in Treforest with a cousin. A few years later he took night courses at Mountview Academy of Theatre Arts in North London, before being accepted at Rose Bruford College, where he graduated in 1976.

He appeared as Harold Wilson in the 2005 Channel 4 drama Longford and as Hermann Göring in the 2006 BBC drama-documentary Nuremberg: Nazis on Trial. In 2007, he co-starred alongside Genevieve O'Reilly and Geraldine James in the ITV1 drama The Time of Your Life, in which he played a father whose 36-year-old daughter is recovering after an 18-year coma. In his early career, he frequently appeared in Welsh language productions, for example as Edgar Evans in the 1984 TV film Terra Nova, and as a soldier in Karl Francis's Milwr Bychan (1987). Even in more recent years, he has often portrayed Welsh characters, such as Owain Glyndwr in the 2012 BBC adaptation of Henry IV, Part I.

In 2010, Pugh appeared as Tony in the two-part Doctor Who story comprising the episodes "The Hungry Earth" and "Cold Blood". He had a supporting role in 2008 in an episode of Torchwood, another BBC Wales production.

In 2011 Pugh became Judge Patrick Coburn in Justice. The following year he joined HBO's Game of Thrones in the recurring role of Craster.  In 2013 he portrayed Baron Rivers in The White Queen. Pugh played Jack Reynolds in Doctor Foster, and in 2016 joined the cast of Mr Selfridge as Lord Wynstay, another Welsh character.

Filmography

Film
 1980 SOS Titanic UK/US Made for TV movie as James Farrell
 1981 Inseminoid as Roy
 1981 Nighthawks as Kenna
 1982 Britannia Hospital as Picket
 1982 Giro City as John Williams
 1984 Milwr Bychan as RSM
 1989 The Angry Earth as Emlyn
 1991 Old Scores as Bleddyn Morgan
 1993 Tender Loving Care as Keith Dobbs
 1994 Priest as Mr. Unsworth
 1995 The Englishman Who Went Up a Hill But Came Down a Mountain as Williams the Petroleum
 1995 The Near Room as Eddie Harte
 1996 Different for Girls as DS Cole
 1998 The Tichbourne Claimant as The Claimant
 2000 The Testimony of Taliesin Jones as Handycott
 2001 Enigma as Skynner
 2001 Happy Now? as Hank Thomas
 2002 The Intended as Le Blanc
 2002 Undertaking Betty as Hugh Rhys-Jones
 2003 Master and Commander: The Far Side of the World as John Allen
 2005 Kinky Boots as Harold Price
 2005 Kingdom of Heaven as Godfrey's Elder Brother (director's cut)
 2007 The Last Legion as Kustennin
 2008 Goodnight Irene as Alex
 2010 The Ghost Writer as Richard Rycart
 2010 Robin Hood as Baron Baldwin
 2010 West Is West as Mr Jordan
 2012 Hunky Dory as Headmaster
 2012 Love Bite as Sergent Rooney
 2012 Metamorphosis as Mr. Samsa
 2013 The Thirteenth Tale as John the Dig
 2018 Colette as Jules
 2019 Eternal Beauty (2019) as Dennis

Television

 1977 Survivors: "Mad Dog"
 1979 Danger UXB as Sapper Powell
 1983 Woodentop (pilot episode of The Bill) as DI Roy Galloway  
 1984 Amy
 1985 Brookside
 1986-1987 Casualty
 1992 Inspector Morse: "Absolute Conviction" as Geoff Harris, Prison Officer
 1993 Telltale as Billy Hodge
 1995 Resort to Murder
 1995 The Bill: "Powerless" 
 1997 Drovers' Gold 
 1997 Dangerfield: "Inappropriate Adults" 
 1997-1999 The Lakes
 1999 Silent Witness
 1999 French and Saunders: "Witless Silence"
 2001 Sword of Honour as Brigadier Ritchie Hook
 2001 In A Land Of Plenty
 2002 Plots with a View
 2002 Clocking Off
 2003 Prime Suspect: "The Last Witness" as DS Alun Simms
 2003 Waking the Dead: "Multistorey" as Robert Cross
 2004 Hustle “Faking it” as Frank Gorley
 2005 New Tricks “Home Truths” as Eric Grant
 2005 The Virgin Queen
 2005 Agatha Christie's Marple: "A Murder is Announced" as Colonel Easterbrook
 2005 Agatha Christie's Poirot: Cards on the Table” as Colonel Hughes
 2005 Shameless
 2006 Prime Suspect: "The Final Act" as DS Alun Simms
 2006 Nuremberg: Nazis on Trial as Hermann Göring 
 2006 Longford
 2008 Torchwood: "Adrift" as Jonah 
 2009 Robin Hood BBC Series 3 as Lord Sheridan (1 episode)
 2009 Into the Storm 
 2009 Framed 
 2010 Doctor Who: "The Hungry Earth" and "Cold Blood" as Tony Mack
 2011 Justice: (TV Mini-Series) as Judge Patrick Coburn
 2011 The Shadow Line as Bob Harris
 2011 Midsomer Murders: "The Sleeper Under the Hill" as Caradoc Singer 
 2011 Death in Paradise: "Wicked Wedding Night" 
 2012 Shameless
 2012-2013 Game of Thrones as Craster
 2012 Henry IV, Part I as Glendower
 2013 Murder: Joint Venture as DI Sheehy
 2013 The White Queen as Baron Rivers
 2014 Inspector George Gently: "Gently Between The Lines" as Chief Lewington
 2014 Undeniable as Pete
 2014 Common as Detective Inspector Hastings
 2014 Atlantis as Lord Sarpedon
 2015 Doctor Foster as Jack Reynolds
 2016 Mr Selfridge as Lord Wynnstay
 2016 Damilola, Our Loved Boy as DCI Nick Ephgrave
 2017 Vera: "Dark Angel" 
 2017 Knightfall as Jacques de Molay
 2018 The Repair Shop (Series 2–4) as narrator
 2020 - present The Tuckers as Murphy
 2021 - C. B. Strike - as Geraint Winn 
 2021 - present Take a Hike as narrator

References

External links

1950 births
20th-century Welsh male actors
21st-century Welsh male actors
Alumni of Rose Bruford College
Living people
People from Pontypridd
Welsh male Shakespearean actors
Welsh male film actors
Welsh male television actors